Family Glide Hockey (Okiraku Air Hockey Wii in Japan) is an air hockey video game developed by Arc System Works for WiiWare. It was released in Japan on October 21, 2008, and later released in North America on January 19, 2009 and the PAL regions on January 30, 2009.

Gameplay 
Similar to Family Table Tennis, players control a member of a family, including a mother, father, son (Billy), and daughter (Sarah), to play against another in a game of air hockey. The player can choose up to five settings, including a gymnasium, a forest park, a beach, an amusement park, and an arctic aquarium.

The game also features three minigames that involve the player trying the slam the puck into the goal while faced with different objectives, such as hitting targets or solving math problems.

Reception

IGN summed up Family Glide Hockey as "a dull, awkwardly controlling air hockey game", but felt the minigames were marginally more fun than the core game.

References

External links 
Okiraku Air Hockey Wii Official Website (Japanese)

2008 video games
Air hockey video games
Arc System Works games
Ice hockey video games
Multiplayer and single-player video games
Video games developed in Japan
Wii games
Wii-only games
WiiWare games